Ivuniryuaq  formerly the Outpost Islands are an island group located in the Coronation Gulf, south of Victoria Island, in the Kitikmeot Region, Nunavut, Canada. Other island groups in the vicinity include the Bate Islands, Richardson Islands, Sesqui Islands, and Sisters Islands.

References

Islands of Coronation Gulf
Uninhabited islands of Kitikmeot Region